Anna Lunoe (born 26 May) is an Australian DJ, vocalist, songwriter and producer now living in Los Angeles, California. Lunoe has performed at music festivals including Coachella, Lollapalooza, Ultra, TomorrowWorld and Hard Summer. She now hosts a weekly show on Apple Music 1.

Early life
Anna Lunoe was born in Sydney, Australia. Originally of Danish and Lebanese descent, Lunoe grew up songwriting on her acoustic guitar. She began her music career as host of a dance show at FBi RADIO, an independent youth broadcaster in Sydney. She later became the first woman to mix for Ministry of Sound Australia. During her time at Ministry of Sound, she produced three compilations, which all went Gold in Australia and topped the Beatport Indie Dance Compilation Chart.

Career
In early 2012, Lunoe relocated to Los Angeles to pursue her career. Shortly after arriving, Lunoe broke into the EDM world with her debut EP,  Anna Lunoe & Friends, featuring Flume and Touch Sensitive. "Real Talk" received the No. 1 spot on the Beatport Indie Dance Chart for four months.. "I Met You", her collaborative effort with Flume, currently has over 3 million views on YouTube.

In 2014, "Bass Drum Dealer (B.D.D.)" was picked up by Skrillex for a release on his Nest imprint. She also released a Zane Lowe-premiered collaboration "Feels Like" with Totally Enormous Extinct Dinosaurs. After a festival run and 2-month US tour with The Weeknd, Lunoe's second EP, All Out, debuted at No. 4 on the iTunes Dance Chart.

In early 2015, she released "Pusher", alongside Sleepy Tom. To follow up, Lunoe teamed with Chris Lake to produce "Stomper".

On 18 June 2016, Lunoe made history by becoming the first solo female DJ to perform at Electric Daisy Carnival Las Vegas' main stage.

In April 2017, Lunoe announced that she was pregnant via an Instagram post, and proceeded to perform at the Coachella Valley Music and Arts Festival that weekend.

Additional work
In May 2015, Lunoe was approached by Zane Lowe of Beats 1 to work with a group of artists including Dr. Dre, Pharrell, Elton John and Drake on Apple's launch of Apple Music. Lunoe now hosts her own weekly program entitled "Anna Lunoe Presents: HYPERHOUSE", broadcasting live to over 100 countries every Friday at 9PM PT/12AM ET on Beats 1 Radio. She has brought on dance acts such as Jamie XX, Diplo, Kaskade, Boys Noize, What So Not, Tokimonsta and many more.

In 2016, Lunoe launched her own touring and music platform, HYPERHOUSE, curating stages for thousands of fans at music festivals such as HolyShip and WMC along with a 15 city tour, bringing along Sleepy Tom, DJ Sliink, Rezz, Wuki and San Holo.

In 2019, Anna Lunoe launched a new show on Apple Music titled "danceXL"

Discography

Extended plays
 Right Party (2019)

Singles
 "One Thirty" (with Nina Las Vegas) (2019)
 "What You Need" (with Wuki) (2019)
 "303" (2019)
 "Blaze of Glory" (2018)
 "Bullseye" (2017)
 "Godzilla" (2017)
 "Radioactive" (2016)
 "Heartbreak in Motion" featuring Jesse Boykins III (2014)
 "All Out" (2014)
 "Say It Again" (2014)
 "Satisfaction" (2014)
 "B.D.D. (Bass Drum Dealer)" (2014)
 "Breathe" (2013)
 "Up & Down" (2012)

Collaborations
 Anna Lunoe and Born Dirty — "Badass" Mad Decent
 Anna Lunoe and Chris Lake — "Stomper" Ultra Records
 Anna Lunoe and Wordlife — "Midnight" Nest
 Anna Lunoe and Totally Enormous Extinct Dinosaurs — "Feels Like"
 Anna Lunoe and Treasure Fingers — "Bad MF" NEST
 Anna Lunoe and Eli Escobar — "Red Hot" 
 Anna Lunoe and Wordlife — "Tom's Diner" 
 Anna Lunoe and Flume — "I Met You" Future Classic
 Anna Lunoe and Touch Sensitive — "Real Talk" Future Classic
 Anna Lunoe and Them Jeans — "Voodoo"
 Anna Lunoe and Diamond Lights — "Stronger"
 Anna Lunoe and Wax Motif — "Love Ting"
 Anna Lunoe featuring Genesis Owusu "Back Seat"

As featuring artist
 Tommy Trash featuring Anna Lunoe — "Me & U" (2015)
 Sleepy Tom featuring Anna Lunoe — "Pusher" (2015)
 Alesia featuring Anna Lunoe — "Ivo" (2014)
 The Alexanders featuring Anna Lunoe — "Don't Miss" (2014)
 Eric Sharp featuring Anna Lunoe — "Time Drips" (2013)
 His Majesty Andre featuring Anna Lunoe — "Sunshine" (2013)

Remixes
 Flume — "Say It" (2016)
 AC Slater — "Party Animals" (2013)
 Carl Kennedy and Goodwill — "Home" (2011)
 Chris Sorbello — "Dangerzone" (2010)

References

Australian DJs
Women DJs
Australian singer-songwriters
Living people
Owsla artists
Australian women pop singers
Year of birth missing (living people)
Australian women singer-songwriters
People educated at Redlands, Cremorne